Ramón Hernández (1907 – death date unknown) was a Cuban third baseman in the Negro leagues in 1929 and 1930. 

A native of Havana, Cuba, Hernández made his Negro leagues debut in 1929 with the Cuban Stars (West), and played for the Stars again the following season.

References

External links
 and Seamheads

1907 births
Date of birth missing
Year of death missing
Place of death missing
Cuban Stars (West) players
Baseball infielders